Sean Reed Douglass (born April 28, 1979) is a former right-handed pitcher in Major League Baseball  (MLB).

Major league career
In 54 career games (31 starts), Douglass had a record of 7–13, his best year being 2005 going 5–5 in 18 games (16 starts) for the Tigers. He has also spent time with the Toronto Blue Jays and Baltimore Orioles. In April 2008, Douglass signed with the Florida Marlins, but did not appear in a game for their organization before being released in May.

Japanese career
In 2006, Douglass played in Japan's NPB for the Hiroshima Toyo Carp. Douglass started 18 games recording a 9–6 record with a 3.41 ERA and 71 strikeouts.

In 2008 July, Douglass joined NPB for the Tokyo Yakult Swallows.

External links

career stats at Yahoo

1979 births
Living people
American expatriate baseball players in Canada
American expatriate baseball players in Japan
Antelope Valley High School alumni
Baltimore Orioles players
Baseball players from California
Detroit Tigers players
Hiroshima Toyo Carp players
Major League Baseball pitchers
Nippon Professional Baseball pitchers
Ottawa Lynx players
People from Lancaster, California
Rochester Red Wings players
Tokyo Yakult Swallows players
Toledo Mud Hens players
Toronto Blue Jays players